United States v. Hamilton, 3 U.S. (3 Dall.) 17 (1795), was a United States Supreme Court case in which a defendant committed on a charge of treason was released on bail, despite having been imprisoned upon a warrant of committal by a district court judge. The Judiciary Act of 1789 stated that "upon all arrests in criminal cases, bail shall be admitted, except where the punishment may be death, in which cases it shall not be admitted but by the supreme or a circuit court, or by a justice of the supreme court, or a judge of a district court, who shall exercise their discretion therein, regarding the nature and circumstances of the offence, and of the evidence, and the usages of law." Ordinarily, habeas corpus was used to release prisoners held by the judgment of the executive, but not for those whose commitment had been authorized by a court order. Hamilton's attorney argued that the district court judge did not hold a hearing before issuing a warrant for his commitment to jail and that the affidavits alleging treasonous activity were weak, while the government urged that the Judiciary Act did not give the Supreme Court the jurisdiction to review the district court's decision unless there was new information or misconduct. The Supreme Court set bail, but without addressing either attorney's arguments.

See also
 List of United States Supreme Court cases, volume 3

References

External links
 

United States Supreme Court cases
United States Supreme Court cases of the Rutledge Court
United States criminal procedure case law
1795 in United States case law
Prize warfare
Original habeas cases